Vísir.is is an Icelandic online newspaper. It was founded in 1998 by Frjáls fjölmiðlun ehf. And originally published news from the newspapers Dagblaðið Vísir, Viðskiptablaðið and Dagur. On 1 December 2017 it was bought by Fjarskipti hf. along with Stöð 2 and Bylgjan from 365 miðlar.

According to Gallup, it was the second-most popular website in Iceland as of February 2021.

References

External links
 

Icelandic news websites